Little Armenia can refer to :

 The region Lesser Armenia
 The Armenian Kingdom of Cilicia, in the above region
 an Armenian quarter in a city, notably :
 Little Armenia, Los Angeles

See also 
 List of places named after Armenia